Erik Hrňa (born 25 June 1988) is a Czech professional ice hockey player. He played with HC Oceláři Třinec in the Czech Extraliga during the 2010–11 Czech Extraliga season.

References

External links 
 
 

1988 births
Czech ice hockey forwards
HC Oceláři Třinec players
Living people
People from Vsetín
Sportspeople from the Zlín Region
Hokej Šumperk 2003 players
Orli Znojmo players
THK Tver players
HC Plzeň players
HC Havířov players
VHK Vsetín players
Czech expatriate ice hockey players in Russia